Sport Clube de Mirandela (Mirandela) is a Portuguese football club based in the city of Mirandela, in northeast Portugal (Trás-os-Montes region).

Background
Mirandela currently plays in the Segunda Divisão Zona Norte, which is the third tier of Portuguese football. The club was founded in 1926 and they play their home matches at the Estádio São Sebastião in Mirandela. The stadium is able to accommodate 3,500 spectators.

The club is affiliated to Associação de Futebol de Bragança and has entered the national cup competition known as Taça de Portugal on many occasions.

Appearances

Segunda Divisão: 9
Terceira Divisão: 42

Season to season

League and cup history

Honours
Terceira Divisão, Série A: 	2007/08, 2010/11

Current squad

Footnotes

External links
Official website 

Football clubs in Portugal
Association football clubs established in 1926
1926 establishments in Portugal